Bradford Beach is a public beach in Milwaukee, Wisconsin. The beach which was constructed in the 1920s is part of Lake Park; a mile-long park on a bluff above Lake Michigan. Lake Park was listed on the National Register of Historic Places on April, 22, 1993.

Design
Bradford Beach falls within Lake Park which was designed in the late 19th century by  landscape architect  Frederick Law Olmsted, who also designed Central Park in New York City. 

The beach is wheelchair accessible. In 2021 the rising water of Lake Michigan has shrunk the width of the beach.

History
In the 1920s, the beach was created by filling in swampy areas near Lake Michigan. It has been Milwaukee's most popular beach. On the beach near the road, there is a historic bathhouse. The Bathhouse was built in 1949 and includes a walkway above Lincoln Memorial Drive. The Wisconsin Historical Society surveyed it in 2011.

One local resident who patronized the beach was a man named Dick Bacon. Bacon was known to work on his sun tan in the middle of winter at Bradford Beach.

See also
 Parks of Milwaukee
 East Side, Milwaukee

References

External links
Bradford Beach
On Milwaukee Bradford Beach

Protected areas of Milwaukee County, Wisconsin
Parks on the National Register of Historic Places in Wisconsin
Urban public parks
Geography of Milwaukee
Tourist attractions in Milwaukee
National Register of Historic Places in Milwaukee
Parks in Milwaukee, Wisconsin
Beaches of Wisconsin